The Chinatown Gateway Monument is installed in Chinatown, Los Angeles, in the U.S. state of California. The gateway is located at the south entrance to Chinatown on North Broadway, just north of Cesar Chavez Avenue, few blocks from Los Angeles City Hall. In 2020, Wilder Shaw of Thrillist described the gate as "infamous".

References

External links 

 

Buildings and structures in Los Angeles
Chinatown, Los Angeles
Dragons in art
Gates in the United States
Outdoor sculptures in Greater Los Angeles